Clithon diadema is a species of brackish water and freshwater snail with an operculum, a nerite. It is an aquatic gastropod mollusk in the family Neritidae, the nerites.

Description

Human use
It is a part of ornamental pet trade for freshwater aquaria.

References

 Hiroaki Fukumori, Evolutionary history, species diversity and biogeography of amphidromous neritid gastropods in the Indo-West Pacific

External links 

Neritidae
Gastropods described in 1841